(also referred to as Donkey Kong '94) is a 1994 platform video game developed by Pax Softnica and published by Nintendo for the Game Boy. Donkey Kong is loosely based on the 1981 arcade game of the same name and its sequel Donkey Kong Jr.

Like in the original arcade and NES version, the player takes control of Mario and must rescue Pauline from Donkey Kong (who are both given updated character designs for this game). Donkey Kong Jr. makes a guest appearance in the game on some levels, helping his father hinder Mario's progress.

This was the first Game Boy title designed with enhanced features when played on the Super Game Boy. It features gameplay elements from Donkey Kong, Donkey Kong Jr., and Super Mario Bros. 2.

Gameplay

Donkey Kong begins with the four levels found in the original arcade game, in which Mario must reach the top of the level and save Pauline. After these four initial stages are completed, the usual arcade ending begins, but after a few notes of the "victory theme" Donkey Kong revives, grabs Pauline again, and takes off with her, with Mario giving chase. The player is then presented with 97 additional stages spanning nine worlds, for a total of 101 stages with the very last one a fight against a mutated, larger Donkey Kong.

The subsequent levels follow a completely different game mechanic in which the player must guide Mario through each level to locate a key. He must pick it up and carry it to a locked door elsewhere in the stage. Every fourth level is a "battle level" in which the player must either try to reach Pauline, like in the original levels, or defeat Donkey Kong by using his own barrels against him. After the fourth level is cleared, a cutscene is shown depicting a player's abilities that may be needed for the upcoming levels, or to introduce new kinds of traps. At this point, players are allowed to save their progress, including their time for each level or for the total set. Extra lives can be earned via mini-games, unlocked by collecting three special items in each level, or at the end of each set based on the total unused time from that set.

The game features various gameplay enhancements from the original game. Mario is able to survive falling from certain distances, though will lose a life if he falls further. Mario will also lose a life if he hits an enemy or obstacle, though some instances allow Mario to withstand the hit, such as being hit while carrying an item. Similar to Super Mario Bros. 2, he is able to pick up and throw items or certain enemies, which he will need to use to carry the key over to the door. If the key is left alone for a certain amount of time, it will return to its original place. At any point, Mario can flip over onto his hands, which allows him to catch falling barrels, and can also perform higher jumps by timing his jumps from flipping, or by performing a jump while changing direction.

The classic mallet item can be thrown upwards and can be used again if Mario catches it, allowing him to bring it to different parts of the stage. There are also several blocks that allow the player to add bridges, ladders and springs anywhere on the screen for a short amount of time. Other abilities Mario can perform include swimming, climbing ropes in a similar fashion to Donkey Kong Jr. and spinning on wires to reach new heights.

Follow-ups
During its release, Nelsonic released a promotional LCD game wristwatch based on it. It is based on one of the early levels in the original game. Ten years later, an enhanced version of the Game Boy title for the Game Boy Advance was planned, titled Donkey Kong Plus. In addition to featuring enhanced graphics and backgrounds, the proposed remake also featured a level designer accessible through the GameCube. The game ultimately resurfaced as Mario vs. Donkey Kong, a completely new game with similar gameplay. It was followed by a sequel titled Mario vs. Donkey Kong 2: March of the Minis, which featured a level designer. The Game Boy title was re-released as a download for the Nintendo 3DS Virtual Console service in June 2011.

Reception

In the United Kingdom, it was the top-selling Game Boy game for two months in 1994, from October to November.

Since its release, reception of Donkey Kong has been positive, holding an average score of 84.93% at GameRankings based on nine reviews. GamePro described it as both a great killer app for the Super Game Boy and an excellent game in its own right. They particularly praised the nostalgia value of the arcade game levels, the intellectually challenging puzzles of the new levels, and the overall longevity of the game. Electronic Gaming Monthly gave it their "Game of the Month" award, similarly hailing it as an excellent killer app for the Super Game Boy and commenting that it brings back all the best aspects of the arcade, while introducing new concepts.

Nintendo Power praised the game as "challenging and fun" while noting that its control sheme is styled after the arcade games, not the Super Mario Bros., and can be confusing at first. The review gave high marks for the games' play control, challenge and theme & fun.  AllGame gave the game a four and a half star out of five rating, praising the graphics, sound and challenging gameplay that requires a planning and strategy. The review also applauded Nintendo for not taking the "easy route by simply cranking out a remake of the original".

Accolades
Donkey Kong was awarded Best Game Boy Game of 1994 by Electronic Gaming Monthly. In 1997 Electronic Gaming Monthly ranked it number 67 on their "100 Best Games of All Time", lauding it for how it unexpectedly expanded on the gameplay of the original arcade game and offered a steady challenge through its many puzzle-oriented levels. Nintendo Power listed it as the eighth best Game Boy/Game Boy Color video game, praising it as the only true followup to the original Donkey Kong arcade game. Official Nintendo Magazine ranked Donkey Kong 89th on their list of the "100 Greatest Nintendo Games". Game Informers Ben Reeves called it the sixth best Game Boy game. In 2019, PC Magazine included the game in their "The 10 Best Game Boy Games".

Notes

References

External links
 
 Official Nintendo 3DS eshop minisite 
 Official Nintendo 3DS minisite  
 

1994 video games
Donkey Kong platform games
Game Boy games
Mario video games
Nintendo Entertainment Analysis and Development games
Pax Softnica games
Video games about size change
Video games developed in Japan
Virtual Console games
Virtual Console games for Nintendo 3DS
Single-player video games